Yours Truly, the Commuter is the debut solo studio album by American indie rock musician Jason Lytle. It was released on May 19, 2009, by ANTI-.

Reception 

Yours Truly, the Commuter was generally well received by critics. AllMusic called it "a gorgeously atmospheric record, a panorama of lush California landscapes filtered through the lonely lens of winter air and rural, mountainous terrain. There's a familiar mix of electronics and acoustic instruments here, but they're linked together more discreetly than before", calling it "more cohesive than many of those past [Grandaddy] albums". Pitchfork wrote: "Yours Truly, the Commuter sounds an awful lot like a Grandaddy album – not just another Grandaddy album, though, but a really good one, the best since Sumday."

Less favourable was The A.V. Club, writing: "Lytle settles for repetitive mood-setters that merely re-shuffle the elements he's been working with for more than a decade now, with no discernible progress or mastery."

Track listing

Credits 

 Jason Lytle – all instruments, production, mixing, recording, engineering, sleeve artwork

 Additional personnel

 Ariana Murray – additional vocals on "I Am Lost"

 Technical

 Thom Monahan – mixing
 Mark Chalecki – mastering
 Jen Murse – sleeve design

Charts

References

External links 
 Yours Truly, the Commuter on ANTI- Records' official website
 

2009 debut albums
Jason Lytle albums
Anti- (record label) albums